The Anglican Diocese of Garissa is an Anglican See in the Anglican Church of Kenya: the current bishop is the Rt Revd David Mutisya.

Notes

Dioceses of the Anglican Church of Kenya
 
Garissa County
Anglican dioceses of Mombasa